The Lite-On Technology Center is a 23-storey,  skyscraper office building completed in 2002 and located in Neihu District, Taipei, Taiwan. One of the most prominent landmarks in the Neihu Science Park along the bank of the Keelung River, the building serves as the corporate headquarters of the Taiwanese electronics manufacturer company Lite-On. Designed by Taiwanese architect Kris Yao symbolizing a pair of clasped hands pointing to the sky, the Lite-On Technology Center won the 2006 Professional Awards-General Design Award of Honor presented by the American Society of Landscape Architects.

Gallery

See also 
 List of tallest buildings in Taiwan
 List of tallest buildings in Taipei
 Lite-On
 Kris Yao
 Elitegroup Computer Systems Headquarters

References

2002 establishments in Taiwan
Buildings and structures in Taipei
Skyscraper office buildings in Taipei
Office buildings completed in 2002